Nomvelo Makhanya (born 24 April 1996), is a South African Award winning actress and singer. She is best known for her roles in the television serials Isibaya, Soul City and Scandal!. Now recently joined a Netflix film, I am All Girls

Personal life
She was born on 24 April 1996 at Nkandla, KwaZulu-Natal, South Africa. After few years, she moved to Johannesburg with her parents.

In 2016, she was diagnosed with depression and anxiety. However, after several consultation sessions, she overcome the mental depression. In January 2019, an alleged drunk driver crashed into Nomvelo's parked car. In February 2019, she expressed her emotional message through social media, that she has been cyberbullied because of her head.

Career
She joined the National School of Arts (NSA) in Braamfontein, Johannesburg under the guidance of her mother. Then she performed in the musical 'Sarafina' and thought to pursue as a professional artist. Later she joined several theater productions such as The Bald Prima Donn, African Reflections and Maybe This Time. In 2016, she played the role of 'Lindiwe Ngema', in the eTV drama series Scandal!.

References

External links
 

Living people
1996 births
South African film actresses
South African television actresses
People from Nkandla Local Municipality
21st-century South African women singers